Mobiluncus mulieris is a curved, anaerobic bacteria from the vagina of women. Its cells are motile and rod-shaped, having multiple subpolar flagella and multilayered gram-variable cell walls. Its type strain is ATCC 35243. It is often associated with vaginal infections.

References

Further reading
Roberts, MARILYN C., et al. "Antigenic distinctiveness of Mobiluncus curtisii and Mobiluncus mulieris." Journal of Clinical Microbiology 21.6 (1985): 891–893. 

Spiegel, CAROL A. "Susceptibility of Mobiluncus species to 23 antimicrobial agents and 15 other compounds." Antimicrobial Agents and Chemotherapy 31.2 (1987): 249–252.

External links 
LPSN

Type strain of Mobiluncus mulieris at BacDive -  the Bacterial Diversity Metadatabase

Actinomycetales
Bacteria described in 1984